Titanocene dichloride is the organotitanium compound with the formula (η5-C5H5)2TiCl2, commonly abbreviated as Cp2TiCl2. This metallocene is a common reagent in organometallic and organic synthesis. It exists as a bright red solid that slowly hydrolyzes in air. It shows antitumour activity and was the first non-platinum complex to undergo clinical trials as a chemotherapy drug.

Preparation and structure
The standard preparations of Cp2TiCl2 start with titanium tetrachloride. The original synthesis by Wilkinson and Birmingham, using sodium cyclopentadienide, is still commonly used:

2 NaC5H5 + TiCl4 → (C5H5)2TiCl2 + 2 NaCl

It can also be prepared by using freshly distilled cyclopentadiene rather than its sodium derivative:

2 C5H6 + TiCl4 → (C5H5)2TiCl2 + 2 HCl

Focusing on the geometry of the Ti center, Cp2TiCl2 adopts a distorted tetrahedral geometry (counting Cp as a monodentate ligand).  The Ti-Cl distance is 2.37 Å and the Cl-Ti-Cl angle is 95°.

Reactions

Halide replacement reactions
Cp2TiCl2 serves as a source of Cp2Ti2+. A large range of nucleophiles will displace chloride. With NaSH and with polysulfide salts, one obtains the sulfido derivatives Cp2Ti(SH)2 and Cp2TiS5.

The Petasis reagent, Cp2Ti(CH3)2, is prepared from the action of methylmagnesium chloride or methyllithium on Cp2TiCl2. This reagent is useful for the conversion of esters into vinyl ethers.

The Tebbe reagent Cp2TiCl(CH2)Al(CH3)2, arises by the action of 2 equivalents Al(CH3)3 on Cp2TiCl2.

Reactions affecting Cp ligands
One Cp ligand can be removed from Cp2TiCl2 to give tetrahedral CpTiCl3. This conversion can be effected with TiCl4 or by reaction with SOCl2.

The sandwich complex (Cycloheptatrienyl)(cyclopentadienyl)titanium is prepared by treatment of titanocene dichloride with lithium cycloheptatrienyl.

Titanocene itself, TiCp2, is so highly reactive that it rearranges into a TiIII hydride dimer and has been the subject of much investigation. This dimer can be trapped by conducting the reduction of titanocene dichloride in the presence of ligands; in the presence of benzene, a fulvalene complex,  can be prepared and the resulting solvate structurally characterised by X-ray crystallography.  The same compound had been reported earlier by a lithium aluminium hydride reduction  and sodium amalgam reduction of titanocene dichloride, and studied by 1H NMR prior to its definitive characterisation.

Reduction
Reduction with zinc gives the dimer of bis(cyclopentadienyl)titanium(III) chloride in a solvent-mediated chemical equilibrium:

Cp2TiCl2 is a precursor to TiII derivatives.  
Reductions have been investigated using Grignard reagent and alkyl lithium compounds. More conveniently handled reductants include Mg, Al, or Zn. The following syntheses demonstrate some of the compounds that can be generated by reduction of titanocene dichloride in the presence of π acceptor ligands:
Cp2TiCl2 + 2 CO + Mg → Cp2Ti(CO)2 + MgCl2
Cp2TiCl2 + 2 PR3 + Mg → Cp2Ti(PR3)2 + MgCl2

Alkyne derivatives of titanocene have the formula (C5H5)2Ti(C2R2) and the corresponding benzyne complexes are known.  One family of derivatives are the titanocyclopentadienes.  Rosenthal's reagent, Cp2Ti(η2-Me3SiC≡CSiMe3),  can be prepared by this method.  Two structures are shown,  A and B, which are both resonance contributors to the actual structure of Rosenthal's reagent. 

Titanocene equivalents react with alkenyl alkynes followed by carbonylation and hydrolysis to form bicyclic cyclopentadienones, related to the Pauson–Khand reaction. A similar reaction is the reductive cyclization of enones to form the corresponding alcohol in a stereoselective manner.

Reduction of titanocene dichloride in the presence of conjugated dienes such as 1,3-butadiene gives η3-allyltitanium complexes.  Related reactions occur with diynes. Furthermore, titanocene can catalyze C–C bond metathesis to form asymmetric diynes.

Derivatives of (C5Me5)2TiCl2
Many analogues of Cp2TiCl2 are known.  Prominent examples are the ring-methylated derivatives (C5H4Me)2TiCl2 and (C5Me5)2TiCl2.

Catalysis
Titanium catalysts are an attractive from the perspective of green chemistry, i.e. the low toxicity and high abundance of titanium.

Medicinal research
Titanocene dichloride was investigated as an anticancer drug. In fact, it was both the first non-platinum coordination complex and the first metallocene to undergo a clinical trial.

References

Further reading
 .
 
 

Titanium halides
Titanocenes
Chloro complexes
Titanium(IV) compounds